Algol: Tragedy of Power is a 1920 German science fiction film about an alien from the planet Algol.

Production background
The film was directed by Hans Werckmeister and stars Emil Jannings and John Gottowt. The story centers on a human who is given a machine by an alien spirit which, if used, would allow him to rule the world. The sets for the movie were constructed by Walter Reimann, one of the set designers of The Cabinet of Dr. Caligari (released February 1920).

The film was produced by the Deutsche Lichtbild-Gesellschaft (German Light Play Company) in Berlin and was distributed by Universum Film AG (UFA). Its first release was on 3 September 1920 in Berlin, and was subsequently released worldwide including a launch in Finland on 7 November 1921.

Preservation status
For many years it was believed that this was a lost film, but an intact version was recovered. It was screened by MoMA on Monday 29 November 2010 as part of their film exhibition Weimar Cinema, 1919–1933: Daydreams and Nightmares.

Plot 

The story follows the life of Robert Herne, who works in a coal mine, and his friendship with Maria Obal. While working in the mine, he encounters an inhabitant of the planet Algol who gives him a prototype machine which can provide a virtually unlimited source of power. Over the next year Herne sets up a factory providing energy; however, instead of simply relieving workers of the difficult job of mining, the device creates massive economic upheaval throughout the world.

Over the next 20 years, Herne continues to increase his power and influence, but he has lost touch with Maria who now lives in the one part of the world to which his influence does not extend. The film follows the machinations of Herne's son Reginald and his – ultimately unsuccessful – attempt at a coup, aiming to seize the secrets of the machine for himself. Meanwhile, Maria has had a son who travels to meet Herne to ask for his assistance: his country's coal reserves have expired. Herne initially refuses assistance; Maria visits him to ask in person. He comes to realise the extent to which he has been corrupted by power. In a moment of realisation, Herne destroys the machine, thereby preventing his son from taking control after his death.

Cast 
 Emil Jannings as Robert Herne, the protagonist. The film follows his life from that of a normal man to that of corrupt dictator over a period of 20 years.
 John Gottowt as Algol, an extraterrestrial, presumably from the planet orbiting the Algol star, who gives Robert Herne a machine that produces unlimited energy. Algol's motivations are not made clear.
 Hans Adalbert Schlettow as Peter Hell, the son of Herne's friend Maria. He lives in the one part of the world over which Herne has no influence. He travels to seek from Herne aid for his country, but Herne denies his request. He returns to his homeland with Herne's daughter Magda.
 Hanna Ralph as Maria Obal, mother of Peter Hell and a former friend of Herne, from before his encounter with Algol. Her influence causes Herne realise what he has become.
 Erna Morena as Yella Ward.
 Ernst Hofmann as  Reginald Herne, Robert Herne's son and chosen successor. Despite his father's promises to one day show him the secrets of the machine, he hungers for power and seeks to overthrow his father by means of a coup.
 Gertrude Welcker as Leonore Nissen.
 Käthe Haack as Magda Herne, Robert Herne's daughter. Following her father's refusal to provide aid, she realises the extent of his corruption and leaves with Peter.
 Sebastian Droste as a dancer.

See also
List of rediscovered films
 1920 in science fiction

References

External links 
 
 
 Filmportal.de
 Science Fiction and Silent Film Website
 Scifilm.org
 MoMA screening information
 Algol Tragödie der Macht (1920) in Archive.org
 Algol, The Tyranny Of Power, Emil Jannings in Archive.org

1920 films
Fiction set around Algol
Films of the Weimar Republic
German silent feature films
German science fiction films
German Expressionist films
1920 science fiction films
1920s rediscovered films
German black-and-white films
Rediscovered German films
1920s German films
1920s German-language films
Silent science fiction films